Pope Pius VI issued 27 papal encyclicals during his reign as Pope:

Pius 06